Erik Simpson was a Republican Idaho State Representative representing District 32 in the B seat from 2008 to 2012.

Education 
Simpson earned his bachelor's degree from the University of Idaho.

Elections

2008 
Republican Representative Dean Mortimer left the 32B seat open to pursue the district's open senate seat.

Simpson won the May 27, 2008, Republican primary with 1,891 votes (59.2%) against Ann Rydalch.

Simpson was unopposed in the November 4, 2008, general election and won with 17,384 votes.

2010 
Simpson was unopposed in the Republican primary and won with 4,511 votes.

Simpson was unopposed in the November 2, 2010, general election, which he won with 12,748 votes.

Idaho House of Representatives

2011–2012 
In the 2011–2012 legislative session, Simpson served on these committees:
 Commerce and Human Resources
 Environment, Energy and Technology
 State Affairs

2009–2010 
In the 2009–2010 legislative session, Simpson served on these committees:
 Commerce and Human Resources
 Environment, Energy and Technology
 State Affairs

References

External links
Campaign Website

Year of birth missing (living people)
Place of birth missing (living people)
Living people
Republican Party members of the Idaho House of Representatives
People from Idaho Falls, Idaho
University of Idaho alumni